Henry Cooper (1934–2011) was a British heavyweight boxer.

Henry Cooper may also refer to:

Politics
 Henry Cooper (U.S. senator) (1827–1884), from Tennessee
 Henry Allen Cooper (1850–1931), U.S. Representative from Wisconsin
 Henry E. Cooper (1857–1929), Hawaiian politician
 Henry Sloane Cooper (1888–1970), Canadian businessman and politician

Sports
 Henry C. Cooper (1913–?), Australian boxer
 Henry Cooper (footballer) (born 1989), Costa Rican footballer
 Henry Cooper (Northern Districts cricketer) (born 1993), New Zealand cricketer

Other
 Henry Cooper (VC) (1825–1893), English recipient of the Victoria Cross
 Henry Cooper (bishop) (1845–1916), Australian Anglican bishop
 Henry Alexander Cooper (1853–1899), billed by P. T. Barnum as "The Tallest Man in the World"
 Henry Cooper (educator) (1909–1990), New Zealand educator and sportsman
 Henry S. F. Cooper Jr. (1933–2016), writer and environmentalist
 Henry St. John Cooper (1869–1926), English writer
 Henry St. John Cooper, one of the pen names of English writer John Creasey (1908–1973)
 Sir Henry Cooper School, a secondary school in Kingston upon Hull, England

See also
 Harry Cooper (disambiguation)
 Henry Cowper (disambiguation)